Jaime Jr. Frías Flores (born 8 February 1993) is an American-born Mexican footballer who is currently plays in Alacranes de Durango, on loan from Atlético San Luis.

Career
After several years playing for Guadalajara's youth and reserve teams, Frías joined Chivas USA on loan on July 18, 2013.

After spending the entire 2014 preseason training with Indy Eleven, Frias joined the Indianapolis-based NASL side for a season-long loan on April 8, 2014. After a successful season in Indy Eleven he returned to Guadalajara to compete for a chance to play for the first team by playing in the club's third division side, Guadalajara Premier.

References

External links 

1993 births
Living people
Soccer players from Los Angeles
American sportspeople of Mexican descent
Association football defenders
Mexican footballers
American soccer players
C.D. Guadalajara footballers
Chivas USA players
Indy Eleven players
Pioneros de Cancún footballers
Atlético San Luis footballers
Liga Premier de México players
Tercera División de México players
North American Soccer League players
Major League Soccer players